Gianni Quaranta (born August 30, 1943) is an Italian production designer and art director. He was nominated for the Academy Award for Best Art Direction and won the BAFTA Award for Best Production Design and the Nastro d'Argento for Best Production Design for La Traviata (1983). He won the Oscar for Best Art Direction for the film A Room with a View.

References

External links

1943 births
Living people
Italian production designers
Italian art directors
Best Art Direction Academy Award winners
Best Production Design BAFTA Award winners